Jayshree Khadilkar Pande (born 25 April 1962) is an Indian chess player who was awarded the FIDE title of  Woman International Master (WIM) in 1979. She was the first Indian woman to achieve this title. She is the first player from India to achieve this title and won the Indian women's championship four times.

Jayshree Khadilkar was instrumental in changing the world of competitive chess for female players when she secured a mandate from the FIDE president, that prevented them from disqualifying female chess players from national and international tournaments due to their gender.

The three Khadilkar sisters, Vasanti, Jayshree, and Rohini dominated the women's chess championships of India, winning all the titles in its first decade. Jayshree's peak FIDE strength rating was 2120, which she earned in January 1987. Of the three sisters, she has won the most titles and tournaments.

She is also the editor, printer, and publisher of Nava Kaal newspaper.

References

External links

1962 births
Living people
Indian female chess players
Chess Woman International Masters
Sportswomen from Maharashtra
Marathi people
20th-century Indian women
20th-century Indian people
Khadilkar sisters